Wieth is a surname. Notable people with the surname include:

Carlo Wieth (1885–1943), Danish actor
Clara Wieth (1883–1975), Danish actress, wife of Carlo
Mogens Wieth (1919–1962), Danish actor

See also
Wirth

Danish-language surnames